Oorja Fuel Cells (Oorja Protonics Inc) is an energy company that designs, manufactures and commercializes direct methanol fuel cells for application in the logistics, automotive, distributed generation (micro-grid), and telecommunication industries. Oorja develops direct methanol fuel cells ranging in power from 0.5 to 100 kilowatts. Oorja is considered one of the four major players in the North American Fuel Cell Market.

History
Oorja Fuel Cells was founded in 2004 by Dr. Sanjiv Malhotra in Fremont (California), south of the Warm Springs BART station and east of the rail tracks at Tesla Factory. Oorja has been advocate of methanol economy. The company was funded by Sequoia Capital, Dag Ventures, Artis Capital Management, McKenna Ventures Management, and Mingxin China Growth Fund.

Oorja Fuel Cells is working with market leaders around the world such as Toyota Tsusho, Baldor, and US Foods.

Toyota Tsusho
Oorja has partnered with Toyota Tsusho in pursuit of wide commercial adoption of affordable fuel cells to help solve energy and transportation challenges in Japan. As methanol fuel cells cost less than hydrogen batteries because methanol is easier to transport and handle than hydrogen, this will hope to cut down on energy costs in Toyota's home nation of Japan.

R&D Partnerships
Lawrence Berkeley National Laboratory
Los Alamos National Laboratory

Global market
Oorja started focusing mainly in material handling and logistics sector but is now moving to a more global market such as in the telecom, mining and oil and gas industries. Oorja has sales offices in China and South Africa, and have established distribution agreements in South Africa and Mexico.

Products
The company's OorjaPac fuel cell product operates as an on-board battery charger for material handling vehicles. OorjaPac features on-board sensors that keep the vehicle's battery at a constant state of charge, eliminating the need for battery swapping and rapid charging.

The OorjaPac Model 1 provides 5 kW output, as much as 50 times more power to on-board batteries than other fuel cells, the Model 1 could extend the range of electric vehicles like General Motors’ Chevy Volt or Nissan’s Leaf by two to three times.

The OorjaPac Model 3 is similar to the Model 1, but it provides 1.5 kW output.

The OorjaPac Model T is a liquid fuel cell that is tailored to meet the needs of the telecommunication industry.

Oorja Protonics also offers the OorjaRig™, a refueling system that stores and delivers methanol to the OorjaPac™ on-board charging system that is designed for indoor use in commercial and industrial environments.

Awards
MIT Technology Review: Go-to-Market Product 2010
Frost and Sullivan – Product of the Year 2009, 2010
Always ON Going Green – Top 100 Green Company of 2008 and 2009
Modern Material Handling – Products of the year 2009, 2010

See also

 Fuel cells
 Glossary of fuel cell terms
 Direct methanol fuel cell
 Energy development
 Grid energy storage

References

External links
 Oorja Fuel Cells website
 Sanjiv Malhotra Executive Profile

Fuel cells
Energy conversion
Energy storage
Manufacturing companies of the United States
Companies established in 2004
Companies based in Fremont, California